Martin Bruce Adelstein is an American television producer. Before becoming a producer, he was a partner at the Endeavor Talent Agency, where he was one of the founding members. As of 2019, Adelstein is the CEO and founder of Tomorrow Studios, a joint venture between Adelstein and ITV Studios.

Years as an agent
Adelstein has represented writer David E. Kelley for over 20 years. He discovered Kelley after he read his script called "From the Hip" and brought him to Los Angeles to work on his first show L.A. Law. He also discovered Dwayne "The Rock" Johnson while representing the WWE. Adelstein booked him to host Saturday Night Live and the show received the highest rating in 10 years. He was subsequently put in the film The Mummy Returns where he received 5 million dollars for 5 minutes of screen time as The Scorpion King. He also brought actress/writer Tina Fey to the agency as well as writers Bonnie and Terry Turner who went on to create 3rd Rock from the Sun and That '70s Show.

Years as a producer
Adelstein has produced many television series, including the MTV series Teen Wolf, the NBC series Aquarius, the critically acclaimed 2011 film Hanna and the ABC/Fox sitcom Last Man Standing.

Personal life
Adelstein is married and has three children.

Adelstein has joined the advisory board of the Creative Community for Peace (CCFP), an organization that is composed of prominent members of the entertainment industry who promote the arts as a means to achieve peace, support artistic freedom, and counter the cultural boycott of Israel.

Filmography
Prison Break
Teen Wolf
Last Man Standing
Aquarius
Good Behavior
Supreme Courtships
Black Christmas
Point Pleasant
Tru Calling
Mr. Ed

Current projects
Tomorrow Studios produced the TV series adaptation of the film Snowpiercer for TNT that premiered on May 31, 2020 and Hanna, an adaptation of the film that Adelstein produced, as well as the live-action adaptation of the anime Cowboy Bebop. Upcoming projects from the company include the live-action adaptation of the manga One Piece.

Awards and nomination
FOX Production Awards 2008(Best Long Term Show)

References

External links
 

American television producers
Living people
1959 births